Tuy (also Romanized as Tūy, Tūi, Tavi, and Toy) is a village in Daman Kuh Rural District, in the Central District of Esfarayen County, North Khorasan Province, Iran. At the 2006 census, its population was 1,327, in 297 families.

References 

Populated places in Esfarayen County